Poland competed at the 2019 Winter Deaflympics held between 12 and 21 December 2019 in Province of Sondrio in Northern Italy. The country won one silver medal and one bronze medal, both in chess. The country finished in 12th place in the medal table.

Medalists

Chess 

Mateusz Łapaj won the silver medal in the men's blitz tournament.

The women's team won the bronze medal in the women's tournament.

References 

Winter Deaflympics
Nations at the 2019 Winter Deaflympics